Dwight Henry may refer to:

 Dwight Henry (politician) (born 1953), American politician in Tennessee
 Dwight Henry (actor) (born 1962), American actor, baker, and businessman